Sherezad Shah (born 1 August 1983) is a Zimbabwean cricketer. He played three first-class matches between 2001 and 2002.

See also
 CFX Academy cricket team

References

External links
 

1983 births
Living people
Zimbabwean cricketers
CFX Academy cricketers
Midlands cricketers
Sportspeople from Harare